Ata ibn Abi Rabah was a prominent early Muslim jurist and hadith transmitter who served as the mufti of Mecca in the late seventh and early eighth centuries.

Early life 
Ata was born in the town of Muwalladi l-Janad in Yemen. Although early biographical sources differ on the exact year of his birth, it is generally accepted he was born towards the beginning of Uthman ibn Affan's reign, . His mother was a Nubian basket weaver while his father was named Aslam who is described as being dark-skinned and flat-nosed. He was a cripple and possessed a limp, and while he was born with one healthy eye, he later went completely blind.

Life as a scholar 
Ata was raised in Mecca as a mawla (client) of the Qurayshi Abu Khuthaym al-Fihri, where he worked as a Quran teacher, before being recognised for his expertise in fiqh. He was later appointed mufti of the city by the Umayyads and taught in the Great Mosque, where he also lived in the latter years of his life. While in Mecca, Ata met with and transmitted hadith from several companions of Muhammad, including Ibn Abbas, Abu Hurairah and Jabir ibn Abd Allah. His most prominent students were Ibn Jurayj and Qays ibn Sa'd. In 93 AH/711 CE, he was imprisoned on suspicion of being a [[Murji'ah|murji''']] at the behest of Al-Hajjaj ibn Yusuf, but was later released. Biographical sources disagree on the year of his death, but it is likely he died .

 Personal life 
Ata had one child named Yaqub.

 Legacy 

 Piety 
Narrations in biographical works present Ata as a pious and virtuous man. He reportedly only wore simple clothing, performed the Hajj over seventy times, and was able to recite 200 verses of Al-Baqarah in salah without moving despite reaching an advanced age.

 Hadith 
Early hadith scholars, such as Yahya ibn Said al-Qattani, were critical of hadith that Ata had transmitted in mursal form, suspected he may have engaged in tadlis and noted that his intellectual faculties declined towards the end of his life. However, he was generally perceived as a reliable transmitter and later hadith critics such as Ahmad ibn Hanbal exonerated him from tadlis. Several of Ata's students, including his son Yaqub and Ibn Jurayj, transmitted hadith from him in writing.

 Musannaf of Abd al-Razzaq 
Ata is frequently cited as one of Ibn Jurayj's authorities in the Musannaf of Abd al-Razzaq. In a sample of 3,810 narrations selected by Harald Motzki, 39% of those ascribed to Ibn Jurayj are adduced from Ata. Ata relates a tradition in only 20% of these narrations, with the remaining 80% being his own ra'y''. Of the authorities cited in his traditions, 15% are companions of Muhammad, 10% are Quranic verses and 5% are hadith from Muhammad. According to Motzki, Ibn Jurayj attempted to reproduce Ata's narrations faithfully and the corpus lacked signs of fabrication.

References

Tabi‘un
Tabi‘un hadith narrators
650s births
730s deaths
Muftis of Mecca
7th-century Muslim scholars of Islam